Clitocybe amarescens is a species of agaric fungus in the family Tricholomataceae. Widely distributed in northwestern Europe, it was first described in 1969 by Finnish mycologist Harri Harmaja. It fruits in groups or in fairy rings in grasslands. Amarescens signifies "tending to bitterness".

References

External links

amarescens
Fungi described in 1969
Fungi found in fairy rings
Fungi of Europe